Orchestes fagi , beech leaf-miner beetle, is a species of weevil native to Europe. The larvae mine the leaves of beech (Fagus species). It is an invasive species in Canada where it is damaging to American beech.

References

External links

 

Curculionidae
Beetles described in 1758
Beetles of Europe
Beetles of North America
Leaf miners
Taxa named by Carl Linnaeus